Kovalskiy is a crater on the far side of the Moon. It lies about one crater diameter to the southeast of the prominent Sklodowska, and to the north-northwest of Bowditch and Lacus Solitudinis, a small lunar mare.

This feature has been heavily damaged by overlapping impacts, leaving it scarcely distinguishable from the irregular lunar terrain. The satellite crater Kovalskiy P lies across the southwestern rim, and Kovalskiy B intrudes into the northeastern rim. A small crater also lies across the northwestern rim. The interior is irregular and marked by several small craterlets.

Kovalskiy K lies at the midpoint of a high-albedo patch. A single faint ray extends to the southeast directly across Kovalsky.

Satellite craters

By convention these features are identified on lunar maps by placing the letter on the side of the crater midpoint that is closest to Kovalskiy.

References

 
 
 
 
 
 
 
 
 
 
 
 

Impact craters on the Moon